István Tóth (25 April 1938 – 23 April 1999) was a Hungarian boxer. He competed in the men's light welterweight event at the 1964 Summer Olympics.

References

External links
 

1938 births
1999 deaths
Hungarian male boxers
Olympic boxers of Hungary
Boxers at the 1964 Summer Olympics
Sportspeople from Miskolc
Light-welterweight boxers